Bull Lake is a lake in Kenora District, Ontario, Canada. The primary outflow is Fox Creek to Cow Lake, and further through Fox Lake to Agimak Lake on the Agimak River.

See also
List of lakes in Ontario

References

Lakes of Kenora District